Robert Waller may refer to:

 Robert Ferns Waller (1913–2005), poet and ecologist
 Robert James Waller (1939–2017), American novelist
 Robert Waller (pundit) (born 1955), British political analyst
 Robert Waller (Chipping Wycombe MP) (c. 1732–1814), British politician
 Robert Waller (York MP) (died 1698)
 Robert Waller (musician), American rapper and songwriter